Swarg Jaisaa Ghar is a 1991 family based film directed by Swaroop Kumar and produced by Mehmood Nazir.

Plot 
When Raj shoulders the responsibility of his step-brothers after his parents pass away, he is forced to make several sacrifices and face obstacles in life.

Cast
Raj Babbar as Raj
Aasif Sheikh as Amar
Sumeet Saigal as Kiran 
Sonu Walia as Devki
Sonam as Aasha Diwan
Anita Raj as Savitri
Sadashiv Amrapurkar as Sharmaji
Gulshan Grover as Raaka
Navin Nischol as Diwan Dinanath
Rakesh Bedi as Dulare
Shiva Rindani as Chaman

Soundtrack
Lyrics by Majrooh Sultanpuri and music by Bappi Lahiri.

"Deewana Hoon Main" - Alka Yagnik, Kumar Sanu 
"Aao Khele Sanam Sanam" - Mohammad Aziz, Anuradha Paudwal
"Dil Bechoge Haan Lelo Jee" - Kumar Sanu, Sadhna Sargam
"Jai Ganesh Jai Ganesh" - Mohammed Aziz, Suresh Wadkar, Sapna Mukherjee 
"Kitna Pyara Hai (version 1)" - Mohammad Aziz, Sapna Mukherjee, Sudesh Bhosle
"Kitna Pyara Hai (version 2)" - Mohammed Aziz 
"Jalta Hai Badan" - Kavita Krishnamurthy 
"Zara Dekho Sajan" - Shabbir Kumar, Sapna Mukherjee
"Swarg Jaisa Ghar" - Bappi Lahiri
"Madhuhan (version 1)" - Bappi Lahiri 
"Madhuhan (version 2)" - Bappi Lahiri 
"Madhuhan (version 3)" - Bappi Lahiri

References

External links
 

1991 films
1990s Hindi-language films
Films scored by Bappi Lahiri
Indian family films